Supré is an Australian fast fashion women's wear chain owned by the Cotton On Group. Known for fashion items and basics at an affordable price point, the Supré product offering is aimed at the youth market.

History 
Supré was founded by retailers Hans and Helen van der Meuleen in New South Wales in 1984.

In 2013, the Cotton On Group acquired Supré  with plans to expand the brand internationally. The Supré head office is located in Geelong, Victoria, at the Cotton On Group headquarters.

Supré has become known for a robust social media presence, with over 520 thousand ‘likes’ on Facebook and over 70 thousand followers on picture-sharing app Instagram.

Supre  has mainly sold women's clothing, however has had men's sections at times over the years.

In November 2018, Supré was fined by the Queensland Office of Fair Trading (OFT) for misleading customers about the price of clothing at the brand's Chermside store.

Products 
Supré sells fashion denim, tops, printed tees, dresses and more.

References

External links
 

Australian companies established in 1984
Retail companies established in 1984
Clothing brands of Australia
Clothing retailers of Australia
Companies based in Victoria (Australia)